The 1926 Grand Prix season was the second AIACR World Manufacturers' Championship season and the first running to new 1.5-litre regulations. The championship was won by Bugatti and its Type 35 was the dominant car of the year.

The schedule was increased from four to five championship races. The Belgian round was dropped but the British Grand Prix and San Sebastián Grand Prix were added. Many races had promising entry lists, but when a number of cars did not arrive, it led to farcical races with just a handful of starters and only a couple of finishers.

The leading French teams of Bugatti, Delage and Peugeot arrived for the Targa Florio as, once again, the major Italian teams did not enter. The race was marred by the death of two-time winner Giulio Masetti, crashing his privateer Delage on the first lap. Once again it was the small, nimble Bugatti of Bartolomeo Costantini that held off the rest of the pack. When the works Delage team was withdrawn following Masetti's death, it left Costantini led his team to a 1-2-3 victory.

The opening race of the championship was the Indianapolis 500. Frank Lockhart was a young rookie who substituted in to race for an ill Peter Kreis. Starting from back in the pack he soon joined the leaders and took the front on lap 60. On lap 71, rain forced a stop to the race for over an hour. Upon the restart, Lockhart built up his lead again, so at the 400-mile mark he had a 2-lap lead over the field. At that point rain returned, and he became the first rookie winner since 1914, in the rain-shortened race.

The European rounds of the championship were plagued by entry withdrawals of the works teams, leaving just a handful of starters to contest the races. The most embarrassing was the premier French Grand Prix where only the three Bugatti works cars started, and Jules Goux won, being the only classified finisher. The Delages were fast but poorly designed with the exhaust system placed right beside the drivers’ legs causing burns and exhaustion so that the team lost race-winning opportunities from numerable pit-stops to rest and recover. They did win the inaugural British Grand Prix as Bugatti did not enter and the new Talbots were still too under-developed. In the end, by virtue of being the only team to run the mandatory three races, Bugatti won the second Constructor's Championship.

Outside the championship, Formula Libre races (literally, open formula) were very popular across France and Italy and a number were staged with large fields of local drivers. Germany held its first Grand Prix, won by the young Rudolf Caracciola in difficult wet conditions that caused several serious accidents.

Manufacturers' World Championship 
Sources:

Note: *Race stopped because of weather

The Indianapolis 500 also counted towards the 1926 AAA Championship Car season held in the United States

Other Races
Major non-championship races are in bold
Sources:

Teams and drivers
Sources:

Significant Privateer drivers

Note: * was raced as a relief driver. Those in brackets show, although entered, the driver did not race

Regulations and Technical
The racing death of star Antonio Ascari in 1925, along with a number of serious and fatal accidents drove the AIACR (forerunner of the FIA) to consider changes to its racing regulations. In October of that year, they resolved to combat the dramatic increase in power and speed from supercharging by dropping the engine capacity from 2-litres to 1.5-litres (albeit still open to be fitted with or without a supercharger). The minimum weight was also reduced from 650 to 600 kg. The AAA Contest Board (AAA), in the United States, followed the change adopting similar rules, to an equivalent drop from 122 to 91 cubic inches. Minimum width remained 80 cm with two seats, though only one driver was on board.

For the second year of the Championship, the Belgian Grand Prix was not held this year but two new races were added to the schedule in its stead. Brooklands had resolved its noise-control issues with neighbouring estates and would host the first British Grand Prix. The European Grand Prix was awarded to the Spanish Automobile Club. However, the promoters were concerned the 1.5-litre formula would be poorly supported and therefore also arranged a second race (held a week later) to Formula Libre regulations that would be their official Spanish Grand Prix. This year, along with the mandatory attendance of the Italian GP, teams had to also participate in any two of the other four races to be eligible for the championship.

Meanwhile, the regulations for the Targa Florio engine limits remained as they were. Like Grand Prix events, riding mechanics were now optional.
Once again, the Targa Florio and Coppa Florio were held simultaneously, and this year both events were run over the same five laps. The Coppa Florio was only open to factory teams who had registered. After Peugeot became the first manufacturer to win the Coppa Florio twice they earned its permanent ownership. However, they chose to offer it up for ongoing challenges if it would be contested alternately in Italy and France. In May, the cities of Milan and Turin changed their rules of driving on the left side of the road to line up with the rest of Italy that drove on the right.

Technical Innovation
The new regulations demanded new engines and pushed engineers to think of innovative ways to get the same power from the smaller size. By using a shorter stroke, engines could greatly increase their speed, up to 7000-8000rpm.

Faced with high development costs, Alfa Romeo and Sunbeam instead chose to retire their works teams from racing. Other teams were already prepared. Ettore Bugatti had developed his Type 35 chassis the previous year with a 1.5-litre engine, and finally accepted the need for supercharging with the new Type 39A. Although conventional, the Bugatti was reliable (only running at 5500rpm for its 120 bhp) with excellent balance and road-holding. In non-championship, Formula Libre races, Bugatti still refused to conform to supercharging the Type 35, instead chose to enlarge the engine to get more power, up to 2.3 litres as the new Type 35T. The marque's reliability made them the cars of choice for privateer drivers and wealthy amateurs.

Sunbeam's designer, Louis Coatalen, and engineer, Vincenzo Bertarione, went across to the Paris-based sister-company of Talbot. Their 1.5-litre cars had been racing very successfully in the former voiturette class. The new supercharged Talbot 700 GPLB was delayed in appearing but was the fastest in the field. Problems arose through the season with broken front axles, poor brakes and fractured supercharger casings.

Delage too had a new head engineer: Albert Lory was promoted, and his first design was a straight-8, twin-cam engine boosted by two superchargers. The power output of 170 bhp was the first racing engine to break the magical 100 bhp per litre mark. But with sixty bearings it was intricate and expensive. Less thought was put into channelling away the enormous heat production that would scold and burn the drivers’ feet and legs. It also caused a vacuum effect that sucked exhaust fumes back into the cockpit adding to their discomfort.

Without the need for a riding mechanic, both the Talbot and Delage designs put the drivetrain beside, rather than under, the driver. This in turn meant the cars could be lower giving far better road-holding. The smaller front profile would be more aerodynamic, and all of this enabled the cars to keep their high speeds.

The SIMA-Violet car was designed by Marcel Violet. With a two-stroke 1.5-litre engine, it was so light it needed to carry 200 kg of ballast to reach the weight regulations, which made it uncompetitive. However, it performed better in hill-climb events where no ballast was required. Diatto had got into financial difficulty, which was the incentive for the Maserati brothers to go and start their own company. They were supported in this venture by Conte Diego de Sterlich. Using the engine and chassis parts Alfieri had designed for the last Diatto racer, their first grand prix car was the Maserati Tipo 26, named for the current year. Like others it had twin-overhead camshafts and a Roots-style supercharger.

In Germany, the two major companies Daimler and Benz merged in June and would henceforth be known as Daimler-Benz, and its cars as Mercedes-Benz. In the US, both Harry Miller and Fred Duesenberg developed supercharged 1.5-litre engines for the new formula.

Season review
The French works teams returned to Italy for the Targa Florio. The Coppa Florio was run in conjunction with it – open to works teams only, unlike the Targa. Both were run over five laps while the smallest, 1100cc cars only ran three laps. Peugeot ran two of its successful 174 S 4-litre sports cars for André Boillot and Louis Wagner. Delage had three of its 1925 grand-prix cars with René Thomas, Albert Divo and Robert Benoist. Bugatti had yet another iteration of its Type 35, the Type 35T with a 2.3-litre engine. The drivers were the team-leader Bartolomeo Costantini, veteran Jules Goux and Ferdinando Minoia.
The French were competing against a solid field of privateers, led by the local hero, and two-time winner, Conte Giulio Masetti racing another Delage, Emilio Materassi in his 5.8-litre Itala special and Renato Balestrero in a works-supported OM. Alfieri Maserati also arrived with his brand new Tipo 26.

The race started at 7am, with the cars flagged off at 3-minute intervals. At the end of the first lap, Costantini (the 1925 winner) led from Minoia, with Materassi, Wagner, Dubonnet, Divo, Goux and Maserati all about 3 minutes behind on elapsed time. Boillot hit a dog and had to retire his Peugeot. But the biggest tragedy was when Masetti crashed only 27 km into the race. He went wide at a corner (possibly from a steering or brake fault), rode up the stone banking and rolled, fatally crushing Masetti against the steering wheel. The three works Delages were withdrawn as they got the news. The Bugattis continued to build their lead over the next laps while Goux moved up the field to third. Costantini kept up his pace and led home a 1-2-3 finish for Bugatti, becoming a two-time winner. Maserati was 8th, winning the 1500cc class.

Indianapolis
The opening race of the championship was the Indianapolis 500. Defending champions, Duesenberg had five cars entered. Last year's winner Peter DePaolo ran its new supercharged 1.5-litre model along with Ralph Mulford and Bob McDonogh while rookie Ben Jones had a 2-stroke special. Their biggest rivals, once again, was from Harry Miller and his own new supercharged 91 cubic inch car. After a strong run in 1925, Miller persisted with his front-wheel drive model for Dave Lewis and Earl Cooper. Bennett Hill raced a regular 122 as a third works car. The regular customer team run by Harry Hartz had three cars for Hartz, Fred Comer and Tony Gulotta while another dozen drivers also ran their own Millers. This year, Cliff Durant's Junior-8 team ran three Fengler cars with Locomobile engines for himself, Leon Duray and Harlan Fengler. Englishman Ernest Eldridge also arrived with two of his home-made specials raced by himself and Douglas Hawkes.

Forty cars were entered to qualify but it was marred by the death of Herbert Jones. The 22-year old was the youngest driver in the field. He had Ralph DePalma’s Miller from 1925 (renamed an Elcar Special) but crashed on his second qualifying lap when he clipped the inside wall at speed. The car rolled trapping Jones underneath and he died of his injuries the next day. After qualifying, Cooper had the fastest time, sharing the front row with Hartz and Duray's Fengler with a field of 28 cars. Three Duesenbergs failed to qualify, including the 10-race veteran Mulford. Fengler was another who failed to qualify. Peter Kreis was too ill with flu and handed his drive over to young rookie Frank Lockhart who had shown great speed qualifying as a relief driver.

In front of a record crowd of 145,000, Hartz led the first lap, but Phil Shafer from the second row then overtook him. Meanwhile, Lockhart had quickly moved from 20th to 5th in the first five laps. He, Shafer and Lewis then duelled for the lead over the next 150 miles. When Lewis pitted on lap 60, Lockhart took the lead. He was still leading on lap 71 when heavy rain forced a red flag, stopping the race for an hour. When it resumed, the Millers of Lockhart and Hartz vied back and forth for the lead. Lewis retired on lap 91 with engine issues. But the rain hung around and returned after 200 miles, when the race was stopped again. Lockhart had a two-lap lead over Hartz and was declared the winner in the rain-shortened race. Miller had its first Indy-500 victory, and took the first four places with Pete DePaolo, finishing 5th in the first Duesenberg. Lockhart was the first rookie to win the race since 1914 and split the $34000 prizemoney with Kreis. Hartz was second for the third time in five years.
The 1926 AAA championship was raced over 24 events at seven speedways. Lockhart went on to claim four other wins, tied with Harry Hartz who also had five victories. Hartz, however, was more consistent with 17 top-five placings to comfortably win the AAA championship.

European farce

Just the second year into such a prestigious international tournament, the 1926 season was quite a debacle. The first European round of the World Championship was the French Grand Prix – this year held at the very fast Miramas oval in the south. To reduce speeds, hairpin corners were put at each end. Despite being held in the middle of the year, neither Delage or Talbot were ready and did not arrive. When the small French SIMA-Violet team also pulled out, it left the farcical situation where only the Bugatti works team of three cars arrived for the premier event of the year. The organisers had forgotten to include a clause allowing them to cancel (or at least postpone) the Grand Prix. What followed was one of the most embarrassing World Championship races ever held in any era. Regular Bugatti drivers Costantini and Goux were joined by Spaniard Pierre de Vizcaya. De Vizcaya's supercharger gave out before half time, falling an hour behind. Costantini had also lost ten minutes in the pits when his car would not restart, so Goux had a comfortable lead. The two cars circulated the track for the next three hours, with Costantini also having supercharger problems and stopping every other lap to cool the engine. Goux won by sixteen laps as the sole classified finisher, but at least it gave the Bugatti team the handsome prize of FF100,000. By contrast, the cyclecar race in the afternoon had over 30 entries, won by Salmson over the new challenge from Amilcar.

The next round, three weeks later, was the San Sebastián Grand Prix. Another promising entry list of 21 was once again stymied by non-appearances, this time also including OM, Jean Gras and the privateers Albert Guyot and Ernest Eldridge. Delage did arrive with their new cars and team drivers Robert Benoist, Edmond Bourlier and André Morel, with Louis Wagner as a reserve. The Bugatti team had three cars, with Ferdinando Minoia back for De Vizcaya. During practice in the hot Spanish sun,  the Delage drivers soon found the exhaust and engine heat unbearably hot. The mechanics drilled holes in the engine covers, but it proved unsuccessful. On a sweltering 44 °C race-day, all three drivers were overcome by the heat and had to pit. Benoist had led the first six laps until he had to stop to change spark plus, as Minoia had a lap earlier. Morel took over the lead and pitted to refuel on lap 10. Overcome by heat exhaustion he was taken to hospital, while Wagner took over his car, but he only lasted five laps. Benoist pitted on lap 12, also totally exhausted. Sometime-Bugatti driver, Robert Sénéchal was in the crowd at the race and offered his assistance to Louis Delâge. Gratefully accepted, he took over Benoist's car, rejoining two laps down having never driven a Delage before. Bourlier, meanwhile, had been duelling with Goux for the lead, until he too pitted – his legs badly burned. Sénéchal had soon pitted to rest after only a few laps, so took Bourlier's car out next. While the Delages were faster, the stops to relieve the drivers lost them that time. Meanwhile, the Bugattis kept running. Although Sénéchal was able to pass Costantini when the latter stopped to change tyres, he could not catch Goux, who took his second victory of the season. After the race the Delages were disqualified for using an unregistered driver, however this was overturned by the AIACR three months later as Ettore Bugatti had agreed to it during the race.

By the time of the inaugural British Grand Prix a fortnight later, the Delages had been modified. Their drivers were Benoist, Wagner and Sénéchal. Bugatti did not send their works team, but local driver Malcolm Campbell had his entered. The Talbots were finally ready and driven by Henry Segrave, Jules Moriceau and joined by Albert Divo who had raced for Delage the previous year. The other entries were George Eyston for Aston Martin and aircraft designer Maj Frank Halford in his own Halford Special. To imitate a road course, sandbanks were added to the Brooklands oval to create artificial chicanes. With only nine starters, it was a bit strange to see the sight of the starting grid, with the first eight cars on the front row, and Sénéchal's Delage alone on the second row. From the start, the Talbots shot into the lead, led by Divo. But although fast, they were still unreliable, and Moriceau's front axle collapsed at the end of just the first lap. Those delicate axles and poor brakes meant they had to brake far earlier allowing Benoist to keep up. Divo, Segrave and Benoist were lapping the tail-enders on only the fifth lap although Divo was stopped soon after. Segrave lost a tyre on lap 15, putting Benoist in the lead. The Delages were improved, but the exhaust-pipes were still causing immense discomfort to the drivers. All their drivers were soaking their smouldering boots in buckets of water at each stop. Benoist continued to build his lead over Segrave and Sénéchal. Just at the halfway point Segrave pitted to fix an ongoing engine issues when the car caught fire forcing his retirement. Privateers Halford and Campbell kept circulating reliably six laps down, along with Divo trying to make up his lost time.

Benoist's smooth run ended on lap 63 when he pitted to change all four wheels. His overheated exhaust then stopped his engine restarting and he lost six laps, evaporating his lead. Once back in the race he started rebuilding his lead over Sénéchal, whose own exhaust broke. Wagner (already scalded from his own car that had retired early) relieved him. The heat finally overcame Benoist on lap 81. Once again, the car would not restart, and when Dubonnet took the car out as the relief-driver, he had lost the lead. Not expecting to drive, he raced in his suit without a helmet. About the same time, Halford parked his Special with a broken drive shaft. Divo had driven back to third when his supercharger packed up. This just left three cars running for the last dozen laps. Despite stopping every other lap to cool his feet, Wagner had enough of a lead to win. Campbell had overtaken Dubonnet near the end and bought his Bugatti in second ten minutes later. Segrave, in his Talbot, had put in the fastest lap on lap 2.

For the final race - the Italian Grand Prix - the only two manufacturers eligible for the title were Bugatti and Delage, as no others had competed in at least two of the earlier rounds. But with a 6-point difference, Delage could not win so chose not to attend, and neither did Talbot. Despite several days of practice, the OM team could not get any engine reliability and chose not to start. The three works Bugattis were driven by Costantini, Goux and Louis Charavel (who raced under the pseudonym “Sabipa”). Their competition then, were two cars from Maserati (driven by Ernesto Maserati and Emilio Materassi) and Roberto Serboli's Chiribiri. So, to avoid another farcical championship race, the officials opened the grid up to 1100cc voiturettes. This added a further seven cars (Amilcar, BNC and Marino but not Salmson. Costantini took the lead at the start, and while the Maseratis were initially competitive, both cars retired on only the fifth lap. Serboli's Chiribiri burst into flames when it pitted on the 24th lap, though the driver got out uninjured, and when Goux retired on lap 42, it left the two remaining Bugattis to cruise round for a simple 1–2 victory. Although Costantini had dominated the race, his engine started badly misfiring. Losing twelve minutes in the pits, allowed “Sabipa” to pass and eventually win by seven minutes (two laps). In the 400 km voiturette race, run simultaneously, the winner was André Morel in the works Amilcar (being only four laps behind the Bugattis at the time).

Formula Libre
Outside of the championship and its 1.5-litre restrictions, motor-racing was popular, attracting big crowds and large fields. The season had started in March in Italy with the first Circuito del Pozzo at Verona and the second Grand Prix of Rome. The field included a number of 2-litre cars raced in the championship from the year before. Emilio Materassi led initially in his Itala. Conte Brilli-Peri took over in his ex-works Alfa Romeo P2 and held the lead to the penultimate lap. But his three stops for fuel and tyres allowed Conte Aymo Maggi's Bugatti, which did not need to stop, to close the gap. Maggi caught up and passed him on the last lap to win by eight seconds.

The second Provence GP, at Miramas, was run across five heats to qualify for a final. Segrave won from his teammate Moriceau in their Talbot 700s, beating the Bugattis of William Grover-Williams and Louis Chiron.The second Marne GP was held on a new road course near Reims, a very fast triangular track of long straights joined by sharp hairpins. The Reims track would become a centre for French motor-racing over the next four decades. The Spanish Grand Prix, run a fortnight after the World Championship San Sebastián Grand Prix, instead run to Formula Libre regulations, allowed the teams to run their 1925 2-litre Grand Prix cars. The three regular Delage drivers had recovered from their earlier ordeal and faced the three unsupercharged Bugatti T35s of the works team, and two 2.3-litre Targa-spec privateers. Also starting was Henry Segrave in a 4.5-litre Sunbeam – the car that held the flying kilometre speed record. Once again, the King and Queen were in attendance, on a cooler day than the previous round. From the start, Segrave bolted into the lead, but when rain started on the 4th lap, his bigger car became more unwieldy and he soon retired with a broken front axle – an ailment apparently not exclusive to the smaller Talbot sister-cars. Morel took the lead briefly until he, and teammate Benoist, were both put out with spark-plug issues. At the halfway point, the rain had eased and Costantini had a 6-minute lead over Wagner's remaining Delage, with Goux, privateer “Williams” and Minoia a lap behind. Maintaining his fast pace, Costantini won with a 2-lap lead over Goux who finished second after Wagner, relieved by Benoist, had their issues. Minoia's Bugatti was the only other car to go the distance.

The Italian races were characterised by sizeable fields in 1100, 1500, 2-litre, and larger classes. The contrast between the poorly supported Italian Grand Prix and Milan Grand Prix, held just a week later also at Monza was stark, where the latter had 20 starters across the four classes. Bugatti and Maserati both arrived with two cars (for Costantini, Goux, Ernesto Maserati and Materassi respectively). Henry Segrave bought his 4.5-litre Sunbeam (now with a reinforced front axle) while Brilli-Peri raced Materassi's Itala Special. It was these cars that formed the leading pack at the start. Segrave's gearbox gave up after twelve laps, leaving Costantini and Goux leading by two laps. Despite a puncture for Goux, they held on for a dominant 1–2 victory.

Although now in the AIACR, the German Automobile Club had declared that they did not want their drivers competing. The German races were run with a combination of racing and sports cars, and hill-climbs carried an equal weighting in prestige. The circuits used (aside from AVUS) also reflected this with long, difficult tracks with many elevation changes. A German Grand Prix was officially held for the first time at AVUS in July. It was the first international race held in Germany since the war. A national race for sports-cars the previous year on the Kaiserpreis circuit in the Taunus mountains had been won by August Momberger in a supercharged NSU 1.3-litre. However, it is not recognised as the inaugural German Grand Prix. 
With no strong local Grand Prix cars, and hoping for a German victory, the organisers opened the event up to a mixture of sports, touring and grand prix cars. A big field of 38 cars, including sports and modified racing cars started this year's event. As well as works cars from OM, NSU, Brennabor and NAG, there were a raft of privateers and gentlemen-drivers, including Jean Chassagne and Hugo Urban-Emmerich running British Talbots. Favourites were the two factory-supported Mercedes cars of Adolf Rosenberger and a young, up-and-coming Rudolf Caracciola. They ran 1924 2-litre Grand Prix cars, modified to carry a second seat and unofficially assisted by Alfred Neubauer and his team.

Several weeks before the race, Kurt Neugebauer had almost had a major accident when his NAG got into a slide at 150k/h on a wet AVUS track. During practice, Luigi Platé's Chiribiri collided with Wilhelm Heine's NAG and crashed, killing Platé's mechanic and severely injuring both drivers. On race day, an immense ground of 230000 people arrived. In a staggered start, with the bigger cars flagged off first, Caracciola stalled his car and lost a minute. At the end of the first lap, Rosenberger was leading on elapsed time. Ferdinando Minoia, in the OM, put in the fastest lap of the race on lap two to get up to second, but soon had engine trouble and had to pit. Then after four laps it began to rain, making the track slippery and treacherous. It negated the power of the bigger cars, allowing the smaller Talbots to stay close. Rosenberger led from Urban-Emmerich and Chassagne. Caracciola pitted, losing seven minutes to change spark plugs.
Then at the end of the 6th lap Rosenberger crashed coming out of the North Curve, overcome by leaking fuel fumes. Skidding on the slippery track at over 150kph the car piled into the scoreboard and timekeepers' hut, killing two of the officials and seriously injuring the other while Rosenberger and his mechanic were slightly injured. Three laps later, Urban-Emmerich also crashed at the North Curve. He went wide, breaking through the border fence and injuring several spectators, though the driver got the car back to the pits. Then just half a lap later, Chassagne crashed and rolled the other Talbot at the South Curve. Through all this mayhem, Caracciola raced on in fifth, five minutes behind the leader, lapping the fastest in the field. The rain stopped by the 13th lap. A lap later, the Mercedes was in the lead and pulling away. After the 20 laps Caracciola won by over three minutes from the 2.6-litre NAG of Christian Riecken (who was also the technical director of that company). Caracciola's skill in the difficult conditions earned him the nickname Regenmeister (“rain-master”).

Mercedes arrived as a works team at Solitude in September, running their 2-litre 1924 cars again, this time for Otto Merz and Christian Werner. It was the first race for Alfred Neubauer as the team manager, a role he would fill for another thirty years. A small field also included the NSU works team with their supercharged 1.5-litre cars. Merz won comfortably in a race that ended in heavy rain.

In Britain, racing at Brooklands still was immensely popular. Outside the Grand Prix the premier event was the Junior Car Club 200. A huge field of 38 cars took the start, all labelled as “Specials” by the organisers so that the public would not be confused between the cars racing on the track and those on public sale. Although no works teams were officially entered, there were team-entries running the latest Talbot, Alvis, Aston Martin, Salmson and Amilcar models, along with the previously seen Halford and Eldridge specials. On a sunny but cold day, Henry Segrave and Albert Divo finally got the reliability to get a 1–2 victory.

Jules Goux, now 42, retired at the end of the season. A veteran who had been racing since 1906 with teams including Peugeot and Ballot, he had victories in the Targa Florio (1908), Indianapolis 500 (1913) and the first Italian GP (1921) as well as this year's victories. Meo Costantini also retired at the end of the season but would stay with Bugatti as their team manager.
During the year, Bugatti put out a brochure advertising that its cars had won 503 victories from January to September – almost two a day somehow, which must have included many class victories as well as outright ones. Despite the advances in engine power and technology, it was clear that the new regulations were not inspiring manufacturer support, and therefore not exciting the populace.

Championship final standings
Table lists the  highest race position for each manufacturer.
Note: To be eligible for the championship, manufacturers had to take part in three of the Grand Prix including the Italian GP.
 * non-participation disqualified the manufacturer from the championship

Results of the season's major races

italics show the driver of the race's fastest lap. 
Only those drivers with a best finish of 6th or better are shown. Sources:

Citations

References
 Cimarosti, Adriano (1997)    The Complete History of Grand Prix Motor Racing    London: Aurum Press Ltd  
 Fondi, Pino (2006)    Targa Florio: 20th Century Epic    Milan: Giorgio Nada Editore  
 Fox, Charles (1973)    The Great Racing Cars & Drivers    London: Octopus Books Ltd  
 Georgano, Nick (1971)    The Encyclopaedia of Motor Sport    London: Ebury Press Ltd  
 Higham, Peter (1995)   The Guinness Guide to International Motor Racing    London: Guinness Publishing  
 Legate, Trevor (2006)    100 years of Grand Prix    Kent: Touchstone Books Ltd  
 Ludvigsen, Karl (2008)    Racing Colours - Italian Racing Red    Surrey: Ian Allan Publishing Ltd  
 Ludvigsen, Karl (2009)    Racing Colours - German Racing Silver    Surrey: Ian Allan Publishing Ltd  
 Monkhouse, George (1953)    Grand Prix Racing Facts and Figures   London: G.T. Foulis & Co Ltd
 Montagna, Paolo (ed.) (1989)    The Legendary Italian Grand Prix   Milan: A.C. Promotion
 Rendall, Ivan (1991)    The Power and The Glory – A Century of Motor Racing    London: BBC Books  
 Rendall, Ivan (1993)    The Chequered Flag – 100 years of Motor Racing    London: Weidenfeld & Nicolson Ltd  
 Venables, David (2008)    Racing Colours - British Racing Green    Surrey: Ian Allan Publishing Ltd  
 Venables, David (2009)    Racing Colours - French Racing Blue    Surrey: Ian Allan Publishing Ltd

External links

  1926 Race Season – comprehensive race reports of most events, also listing entries and results. Retrieved 21 Apr 2020
  1926 World Championship – several detailed investigation articles about the first championship year. Retrieved 21 Apr 2020
  Grand Prix Winners 1895–1949 : History – Hans Etzrodt's description of the annual regulations, and changes. Retrieved 21 Apr 2020
  TeamDan  - list of the major races, entrants and results. Retrieved 21 Apr 2020
  SpeedFreaks  - list of the major races, entrants and results. Retrieved 21 Apr 2020
  6th Gear  - list of the major races and winners each year. Retrieved 21 Apr 2020
  MotorSport magazine – list of the year's races, entrants and results, by category. Retrieved 21 Apr 2020
  Grand Prix History – history of the Targa Florio race. Retrieved 21 Apr 2020
  La Targa Florio – race report and pictures of the Targa Florio. Retrieved 21 Apr 2020
  F2 Register – race results of the Targa Florio. Retrieved 21 Apr 2020
  Motorsport Memorial – motor-racing deaths by year. Retrieved 21 Apr 2020
  Racing Reference.com – list of all the AAA Championship results. Retrieved 21 Apr 2020
  ChampCar Stats – list of all the races, entrants and results of the AAA Championship. Retrieved 21 Apr 2020
  Indianapolis Motor Speedway.com – Indy 500 race results. Retrieved 21 Apr 2020

Grand Prix seasons
1926 in motorsport
 
1926 in American motorsport